Seosamh Ó Maoileoin (born Joseph Malone) is an Irish Republican from Meedin, Tyrrellspass, County Westmeath. He has been the president of Republican Sinn Féin since November 2018 following the resignation of Des Dalton.

Family 
Seosamh is from a notable Republican family, his uncles Tomás Malone and Séamas participated in the Easter Rising, Irish War of Independence and the following Irish Civil War.

References 

Irish republicans
Living people
Republican Sinn Féin members
Year of birth missing (living people)